Eastern Slavonia may refer to:

 eastern part of the modern region of Slavonia, alternatively called Croatian Podunavlje, in Croatia
 eastern part of the medieval Banate of Slavonia
 eastern part of the early modern Kingdom of Slavonia
 shorthand for the former unrecognized entity SAO Eastern Slavonia, Baranja and Western Syrmia
 shorthand for the transitional entity Eastern Slavonia, Baranja and Western Syrmia (1995–98)
 shorthand for the United Nations Transitional Administration for Eastern Slavonia, Baranja and Western Sirmium (1996-1998)

See also
 Slavonia (disambiguation)
 Western Slavonia (disambiguation)